Bayview, California may refer to:
 Bayview, Contra Costa County, California, census designated place
 Bayview, Humboldt County, California, census designated place